Carrollton Township is one of thirteen townships in Greene County, Illinois, USA.  As of the 2010 census, its population was 2,966 and it contained 1,392 housing units.

Geography

Cities, towns, villages
 Carrollton

Unincorporated towns
 Berdan at 
 Kaser at 
 Pegram at 
(This list is based on USGS data and may include former settlements.)

Cemeteries
The township contains these seven cemeteries: Berdan, Carter, Elm Dale, Hopewell, Pinkerton Number 1, Saint Johns Catholic and Smith.

Major highways
  Illinois Route 108
  Illinois Route 67

Airports and landing strips
 Boyd Hospital Heliport

Lakes
 Horseshoe Lake

Landmarks
 Fairgrounds
 Rainey Park

Demographics

School districts
 Carrollton Community Unit School District 1

Political districts
 Illinois' 19th congressional district
 State House District 97
 State Senate District 49

References
 
 United States Census Bureau 2007 TIGER/Line Shapefiles
 United States National Atlas

External links
 City-Data.com
 Illinois State Archives

Townships in Greene County, Illinois
Townships in Illinois